Liam Raymond Dudding (born 13 June 1994) is a New Zealand cricketer. He made his first-class debut for Central Districts on 15 March 2016 in the 2015–16 Plunket Shield. He made his List A debut for Central Districts on 25 January 2017 in the 2016–17 Ford Trophy.

Dudding was educated at St John's College, Hastings. An opening bowler, he has played Hawke Cup cricket for Hawke's Bay since 2015. He became a full-time contracted player for Central Districts in July 2022.

References

External links
 

1994 births
Living people
People educated at St John's College, Hastings
New Zealand cricketers
Central Districts cricketers
Cricketers from Hamilton, New Zealand